The Quebec City–Windsor Corridor, also known as simply the Corridor, is a Via Rail passenger train service in the Canadian provinces of Quebec and Ontario. The Corridor service area has the heaviest passenger train frequency in Canada and contributes 67% of Via's revenue.

History 
Prior to Via's formation in 1978, CN Rail operated its passenger trains, branded Rapido, on the same tracks and CP Rail also offered limited service.

High-speed proposal 

During the 1970s and early 1980s, CN and later Via Rail operated the Turbo Train on existing freight rail trackage. This equipment was later replaced by the Bombardier LRC (Light, Rapid, Comfortable) train sets. Beginning in the 1980s and through the 1990s, Via Rail, Bombardier and the provincial and federal governments studied the feasibility of establishing a dedicated high-speed passenger rail network linking Quebec City–Montreal–Ottawa–Toronto–Windsor similar to the French TGV as a means of reducing domestic air and highway travel between these destinations.

After a hiatus of ten years, a feasibility study on launching a high-speed rail service in the Corridor will be updated at the joint cost of the federal government, Ontario and Quebec. On November 14, 2011, the three governments officially released the final report of a high-speed rail study for this corridor.

2009–2010 improvements 
In 2009–2010, Via used  of government stimulus money to upgrade segments of the Corridor. Improvements were made to several stations along the line, with new station buildings constructed at Belleville and Cobourg, and additional platforms for existing stations at Brockville and Oshawa. The improvements were planned to reduce delays along the route and to allow for a reduction in travel time of up to 30 minutes from end to end. They were intended to allow Via to introduce two new round-trip trains from Toronto to both Montreal and Ottawa without requiring the acquisition of new equipment.

Service

Inter-city rail 

Inter-city service along the Corridor is provided by several different routes connecting the different cities served by the service. There is no single route that travels the entire length of the Corridor from Windsor to Quebec City. Via runs a mix of local-service and express trains in the Corridor. The Corridor service area has the heaviest passenger train frequency in Canada, with 36 Via trains traversing the route daily. About 67% of Via's revenue comes from Corridor routes.

Via trains that start and end within the geographic region of the Quebec City–Windsor Corridor are branded as a part of the Corridor service. Other inter-city trains from outside the Corridor may have their terminus at stations in the Corridor, such as the Canadian and the Ocean, but are marketed by their respective train names and are not considered to be Corridor services.

The Maple Leaf, a through service from Toronto to New York City, operated jointly with Amtrak, is crewed by Via as trains 97 and 98 on VIA schedules, between Toronto and Niagara Falls, and can be considered part of Corridor services as well. It is the only scheduled rail service from the Corridor line from Burlington to Niagara Falls.

Commuter rail

Two commuter rail agencies, GO Transit and Exo, share tracks with Via's Corridor trains. Both agencies are provincially funded and independent of Via.

 The GO Transit Kitchener line shares tracks with Via trains for its entire route from Toronto Union Station to Kitchener station and a pilot to London station.
 The GO Transit Lakeshore West line shares tracks with Via trains from Toronto Union Station to Bayview junction, just west of Aldershot GO Station. The Lakeshore West line Niagara Branch shares tracks with Via trains for its entire route from Toronto Union Station to Niagara Falls.
 The GO Transit Lakeshore East line shares tracks with Via trains from Toronto Union Station to Durham Junction, just west of Pickering GO Station. Between Pickering and Oshawa, GO trains use a separate parallel line immediately north of the CN/Via tracks.
 The Exo Mont-Saint-Hilaire line shares tracks with Via trains for its entire route from Montreal Central Station to Mont-Saint-Hilaire.
 The Exo Vaudreuil-Hudson line operates in the same corridor as Via trains from Dorion to Lachine, but does not share tracks with Via trains. Exo trains operate on CP tracks, while Via trains operate on parallel CN tracks.

Trackage 
Most of the trackage that Via trains use along the Corridor is owned by the Canadian National Railway. Via owns three former freight lines long the Corridor, one from Smiths Falls to Coteau-du-Lac, Quebec, via Ottawa; one from Smiths Falls to Brockville; and one from Chatham, Ontario, to Windsor, Ontario. Via Corridor trains run on three segments of tracks owned by Metrolinx; one from Burlington, Ontario, to Pickering, Ontario; one from Toronto Union Station to Malton, Mississauga; and one from Georgetown, Ontario, to Kitchener, Ontario. The proposed High Frequency Rail plan calls for adding Corridor services between Toronto and Quebec City that run on newly constructed dedicated tracks.

Future 
On July 6, 2021, Transportation Minister Omar Alghabra announced that the federal government would launch the procurement process to build a high-frequency rail corridor between Toronto and Quebec City by 2030. As opposed to current operations along the Corridor, the trains would run on dedicated passenger tracks, improving service reliability since the trains would not have to compete with freight trains. Service reliability could increase to 95 percent, up significantly from its current 67 percent. Travel times are projected to decrease by 90 minutes on some routes, such as between Ottawa and Toronto. 90 percent of the route is planned to run on electricity. The timing of the announcement was criticized as political, since there was speculation of a federal election being held later in the year, which was later confirmed on August 15.

See also 

 High-speed rail in Canada
 Maple Leaf (Amtrak)
 Northeast Corridor
 Quebec City–Windsor Corridor
 Rail transport in Ontario

References

External links
Via Rail temporary train schedule with changes due to Covid 19 (Effective 17 May 2021)

Via Rail routes
Passenger rail transport in Ontario
Passenger rail transport in Brantford
Passenger rail transport in Kitchener, Ontario
Passenger rail transport in Toronto
Passenger rail transport in Quebec